The Go For Wand Handicap is an American Thoroughbred horse race established in 1954 for fillies and mares age three and up. Raced in the fall, it is a Grade III race (Grade I before 2010) on dirt at a distance of one mile.

Inaugurated in 1954 at Belmont Park as the Maskette Stakes in honor of the Hall of Fame filly, Maskette, it was renamed in 1992 for its ill-fated 1990 winner and Hall of Fame inductee, Go For Wand who is buried in the infield at Saratoga Race Course.

The Maskette took place at Aqueduct Racetrack in 1959, 1960, and from 1962 to 1968. From 1994–2009, the Go For Wand was hosted at the Saratoga Race Course.  After not being raced in 2010, the Go For Wand Handicap returned to Aqueduct on November 25, 2011.   The distance reverted to the mile distance the race was contested at prior to its move to Saratoga Race Course.

Since inception, the race has been contested at various distances:
 1 mile (8 furlongs) : 1954–1981, 1983–1993, 2011-
 7 furlongs : 1982
  miles (9 furlongs) : 1994–2009

The race was run in two divisions in 1976.

This race was downgraded to a Grade III for its 2014 running.

Records
Speed record:
Lady's Secret – 1:33.60 (1986) (at current 8 furlong distance)

Most wins:
 2 – Tempted (1958, 1960)
 2 – Tosmah (1964, 1965)
 2 – Lady's Secret (1985, 1986)
 2 – Ginger Punch (2007, 2008)

Most wins by a jockey:
 6 – Ángel Cordero Jr. (1967, 1970, 1972, 1979, 1987, 1991)

Most wins by a trainer:
 6 – C. R. McGaughey III (1988, 1991, 1992, 1995, 1998, 2001)

Most wins by an owner:
 5 – Ogden Phipps (1972, 1979, 1988, 1992, 1995)

Winners

† In 1974, Desert Vixen finished first, but was later disqualified.

References

Mile category horse races for fillies and mares
Graded stakes races in the United States
Grade 3 stakes races in the United States
Horse races in New York (state)
Recurring sporting events established in 1954
Aqueduct Racetrack
1954 establishments in New York (state)